The Humphrey Perkins School is a secondary school with academy status which was founded in 1717 in Barrow upon Soar, Leicestershire, in England.

History

Grammar school
The school was founded as the Humphrey Perkins Grammar School in 1717 in the will of Humphrey Perkins. Perkins was born in Barrow upon Soar and went to the University of Cambridge before becoming the rector of Holme Pierrepont, Nottinghamshire, until his death in 1717. He left money for a grammar school to be built in Barrow upon Soar, and after land was acquired on an orchard near the centre of the village, the school opened in 1735 with 32 pupils.

In 1902 the school moved to larger premises on Cotes Road, with the school's first non-clergyman headmaster, Fernsby, and 33 pupils. Of these pupils 32 were boys with just one girl, Nora May Wall. In 1927 the then headmaster, Keeble, introduced a school uniform of black blazer, badge and ties. Examples of this uniform are still kept by the current headmistress, along with a school rugby shirt. The four houses were named after pre-eminent Leicestershire families as Beaumont, Grey, Hastings and Latimer.

Secondary modern school
In 1947 the grammar school closed and a secondary modern school was opened on the same site. In 1956 this became a single bilateral school, with approximately 500 pupils. Dunn became headmaster in 1960, and discussions began about whether Humphrey Perkins or the nearby Rawlins Grammar School at Quorn would be the 'Upper School' in the new two-tier Leicestershire education model.

Comprehensive three-tier system
In 1966 Humphrey Perkins was converted to a junior high school for 11- to 14-year-olds, with some 1000 pupils.

Academy
In September 2010, Peter Nutkins joined the school as Headmaster, and the school underwent a period of rapid reorganisation and development. On 1 January 2012 Humphrey Perkins became an Academy School and converted to an 11–16 that same year, taking older pupils from September 2013.

Teaching
The school was inspected in 2011–12 and issued with a notice to improve after being judged inadequate. Only 14 months later the school was judged as 'good' by the return OFSTED inspection as the improvements that had taken place brought about change.

Pupils within the school were given iPads to encourage creativity. The school held training events for other schools on the use of the devices in the classroom. Nutkins took a strong stance on including creative subjects in the curriculum and is a member of the Heads for Arts national lobby group.

In September 2017, most iPads were removed from the school, with pupils no longer having them, but the staff still use them.

Notable former pupils
 Louise Lear, BBC weather presenter, from Rothley (took her A-levels at Quorn)
 Jenny Tomlinson, Archdeacon of Birmingham since 2019, from Quorn (took her A-levels at Quorn)

References

 The History of Humphrey Perkins School, Bernard Elliott, 1965
 "Humphrey Perkins High School – 100 Years on the Cotes Road Site", John Hindley, 2002
 "Humphrey Perkins School", 2013

External links
 Official School website

Academies in Leicestershire
Borough of Charnwood
Loughborough
Secondary schools in Leicestershire